Thomas Methodist Episcopal Chapel, also known as Thomas Chapel and Thomas Chapel United Methodist Church, is a historic Methodist Episcopal church located at Thaxton, Bedford County, Virginia.  It was built in 1844, and is a small, rectangular-plan, one-story, one-room, brick structure in a vernacular Greek Revival style.  It measures 30 feet wide and 40 feet long, and has a three-bay facade and a pedimented front gable roof.

It was listed on the National Register of Historic Places in 2004.

References

Methodist churches in Virginia
Churches completed in 1844
Greek Revival church buildings in Virginia
Churches in Bedford County, Virginia
Churches on the National Register of Historic Places in Virginia
National Register of Historic Places in Bedford County, Virginia
1844 establishments in Virginia